Ctenopseustis is a genus of moths belonging to the subfamily Tortricinae of the family Tortricidae.

Species
Ctenopseustis filicis Dugdale, 1990
Ctenopseustis fraterna Philpott, 1930
Ctenopseustis haplodryas Meyrick, 1920
Ctenopseustis herana (Felder & Rogenhofer, 1875)
Ctenopseustis obliquana (Walker, 1863)
Ctenopseustis servana (Walker, 1863)

See also
 List of Tortricidae genera

References

 ;  1983 (imprint 1982): Review of the genus Ctenopseustis Meyrick (Lepidoptera: Tortricidae), with reinstatement of two species. New Zealand journal of zoology, 9 (4): 427-435. 
  1990: Reassessment of Ctenopseustis Meyrick and Planotortrix Dugdale with descriptions of two new genera (Lepidoptera: Tortricidae). New Zealand journal of zoology, 17 (3): 437–465. 
  et al. 2009: DNA barcoding of the endemic New Zealand leafroller moth genera, Ctenopseustis and Planotortrix. Molecular ecology resources, 9: 691–698. 
 , 1885, New Zealand J. Sci. 2: 348. 
 , 2005, World Catalogue of Insects 5.

External links
 tortricidae.com

Archipini
Tortricidae genera
Taxa named by Edward Meyrick